Houstonia Township is an inactive township in Pettis County, in the U.S. state of Missouri.

Houstonia Township was erected in 1873, taking its name from the community of Houstonia, Missouri.

References

Townships in Missouri
Townships in Pettis County, Missouri